Heleobia castellanosae is a species of small freshwater snail, an operculate gastropod mollusk in the family Cochliopidae.

The specific name castellanosae is in honour of Argentinian malacologist Zulma Judith Ageitos de Castellanos.

Distribution
Argentina.

Ecology
Parasites of Heleobia castellanosae include trematodes Lobatostoma jungwirthi and Lobatostoma pacificum.

References

External links

Cochliopidae
Gastropods described in 1974